Opsariichthys is a genus of cyprinid fish found in freshwater habitats in Mainland China (including Hainan), Taiwan, Japan, Korea, and Vietnam. There are currently 12 described species in the genus.

Species
There are 12 species, some with uncertain status:

The status of Opsariichthys bea and Opsariichthys hieni are uncertain; the former might belong to the genus Parazacco and the latter to Rasbora.

References

 
Freshwater fish genera
Cyprinidae genera
Cyprinid fish of Asia
Taxa named by Pieter Bleeker